Dominica competed at the 2015 Pan American Games in Toronto, Ontario, Canada from July 10 to 26, 2015.

Track and field athlete David Registe was the flagbearer for the team during the opening ceremony. A total of six officials accompined the team.

Dominica (along with nine other countries) left the games without winning a medal, marking the first time since 2003 the country failed to medal. Athlete Yordanis Durañona, had the country's highest placement, a fourth place finish in the triple jump, just off the podium.

Competitors
The following table lists Dominica's delegation per sport and gender.

Athletics

Dominica qualified four athletes (three men and one woman).

Men
Field events

Women
Field events

Boxing

Dominica qualified one female boxer.

Woman

See also
Dominica at the 2016 Summer Olympics

References

Nations at the 2015 Pan American Games
P
2015